Walter Hughes (13 August 1882 – 16 August 1917) was an Australian cricketer. He played five first-class matches for Western Australia in 1912/13.

See also
 List of Western Australia first-class cricketers

References

External links
 

1882 births
1917 deaths
Australian cricketers
Western Australia cricketers
Cricketers from Adelaide